A. Jagannathan (26 November 19357 October 2012) was an Indian film director who worked in the Tamil, Telugu, Kannada and Hindi film industries and he was introduced by R.M. Veerappan in his Sathya Movies banner for Manipayal. He directed nearly 50 films in Tamil.

Film career
He made his debut as director in Manipayal in 1973 after working as an assistant to T. Prakash Rao and P. Neelakantan for almost 15 films, most of them being MGR movies. He directed the MGR film Idhayakkani, under the tutleage of R.M.Veerappan and went on to direct five other blockbuster films for RMV's Sathya Movies including Moondru Mugam with Rajinikanth and Kadhal Parisu with Kamal Hasaan.  He also directed  some television serials.

He directed Sivaji Ganesan's Vellai Roja which won awards including the Filmfare Award. Another successful venture in his career was Moondru Mugam.

Partial filmography

Death
He suffered from breathing ailments and was hospitalized in Coimbatore for a fortnight. He died on 7 October 2012, and was cremated at Tiruppur. He was survived by his wife Rajamani, daughters Usha Devi and Pavithra Devi and son Arun Kumar.

References

External links 

Tamil film directors
Telugu film directors
Kannada film directors
People from Tiruppur
Filmfare Awards South winners
1935 births
2012 deaths
20th-century Indian film directors
Film directors from Tamil Nadu